Lovage, Levisticum officinale, is a tall perennial plant, the sole species in the genus Levisticum in the family Apiaceae, subfamily Apioideae. It has been long cultivated in Europe, the leaves being used as a herb, the roots as a vegetable, and the seeds as a spice, especially in southern European cuisine.

Description

The stems and leaves are shiny glabrous green to yellow-green and smell somewhat similar to celery when crushed. The flowers are yellow to greenish-yellow,  diameter, produced in globose umbels up to  diameter; flowering is in late spring.

Distribution
Levisticum officinale is native to Afghanistan and Iran,  but has been introduced to most of Europe, and parts of South-East Asia, North and South America. It has been long cultivated in Europe, the leaves being used as an herb, the roots as a vegetable, and the seeds as a spice, especially in southern European cuisine.

Properties and uses
The leaves can be used in salads, or to make soup or season broths, and the roots can be eaten as a vegetable or grated for use in salads. Its flavour and smell are reminiscent both of celery and parsley, only more intense and spicy than those of either. The seeds can be used as a spice in the same way as fennel seeds. 
<li>In the Netherlands, lovage leaves are traditionally cooked with white asparagus and salt; and served with boiled eggs.
<li>In Ukraine, lovage (in Ukrainian любисток/liubystok), is considered an aphrodisiac. Traditionally, an infusion prepared from lovage leaves has been used by women for rinsing their hair, in order to attract men with the pleasant spicy smell of the plant. Nowadays, hair conditioners can be bought which contain lovage extract to strengthen the hair. Lovage leaves and roots are also used in salads and as a spice in Ukraine. 
<li>In Romania, the leaves are a preferred seasoning for the various local broths and are just as popular, in this respect, as parsley or dill. Furthermore, the dried foliage and seeds are added to pickled cabbage and cucumbers both to aid in their preservation and to add flavour to them. 
<li>In the UK, an alcoholic lovage cordial is traditionally added to brandy as a winter drink and is or was popular in Cornwall where it was originally added to slightly spoiled smuggled brandy to hide the taste of salt. 

The roots, which contain a heavy, volatile oil, are used as a mild aquaretic. Lovage root contains furanocoumarins which can lead to photosensitivity.

Etymology

The name "lovage" is from "love-ache", ache being a medieval name for parsley; this is a folk-etymological corruption of the older French name , from late Latin , in turn thought to be a corruption of the earlier Latin , 'of Liguria' (northwest Italy), where the herb was grown extensively. In modern botanical usage, both Latin forms are now used for different (but closely related) genera, with Levisticum for (culinary) lovage, and Ligusticum for Scots lovage, a similar species from northern Europe, and for related species.

References

External links

Edible Apiaceae
Medicinal plants
Perennial plants
Plants described in 1824
Apioideae